Invictokoala monticola is an extinct phascolarctid marsupial mammal from the middle Pleistocene of central-eastern Queensland, Australia. The holotype was found during cave excavations at Mount Etna (a local mountain in central-eastern Queensland which was named after the famed Sicilian volcano). It was first named by Gilbert J. Price and Scott A. Hocknull in 2011.

References

Pleistocene mammals of Australia
Koalas
Pleistocene marsupials
Fossil taxa described in 2011
Prehistoric vombatiforms
Prehistoric marsupial genera